Meir Kessler (born February 17, 1961) is the Chief Rabbi and head of Rabbinical Court of Modi'in Illit.

He was born at Bnei Brak and studied at the Ponevezh yeshiva and afterward at Kol Torah under Rabbi Shlomo Zalman Auerbach.

After his marriage, he moved to Jerusalem and continued his studies at the Brisk yeshiva under Rabbi Avrohom Yehoshua Soloveitchik.

When his father died in June, 1996, he succeeded him as the second rabbi of Modi'in Illit.

His wife is an educator and writer.

References 

Living people
1961 births
Chief rabbis of cities in Israel
People from Bnei Brak
Ponevezh Yeshiva alumni